Wayang Kampung Sebelah (commonly abbreviated to WKS) is an Indonesian television program featuring puppets made of leather. The puppets reflect the reality of day-to-day life of real world people such as rickshaw pullers, thugs, prostitutes, and politicians.  In addition to appearing on television, Wayang Kampung Sebalah has also performed on stage. Wayang Kampung Sebelah was created by a group of artists who came from Solo. They include puppeteer Ki Jlitheng Supaman and colleagues Yayat Suhiryatna, Max Baihaqi, and Sosiawan Leak.

References

Puppets
Wayang